This is a list of notable musical groups either formed in Halifax or are centered in Halifax, Nova Scotia.

Note: A group must have a Wikipedia article to be included here.

 Alert the Medic
 April Wine
 Aquakultre
 Black Moor
 Contrived
 Crush
 Dog Day
 The Front
 The Guthries
 Gypsophilia
 The Hardship Post
 The Heavy Blinkers
 Hip Club Groove
 In-Flight Safety
 The Inbreds
 Jale
 Jellyfishbabies
 Jimmy Swift Band
 Joel Plaskett Emergency
 Mama's Broke
 Matt Mays and El Torpedo
 MCJ and Cool G
 Nap Eyes
 North of America
 Plumtree
 The Raindrops
 Ruby Jean and the Thoughtful Bees
 Sloan
 Sons of Maxwell
 The Stanfields
 The Stolen Minks
 The Super Friendz
 Tasseomancy 
 Thrush Hermit
 Tuns
 Tupper Ware Remix Party
 Wintersleep

Halifax

Musical groups from Halifax, Nova Scotia